A Volunteer Minister (VM) is a member of Scientology sent to a disaster zone to spread the doctrine of Scientology and provide disaster relief. The program was created in the 1970s by Scientology founder L. Ron Hubbard. As of 2016, the volunteer ministers has a network of over 9,000 trained ministers.

The Church of Scientology says that the program constitutes "the only effective steps to arrest and reverse the deterioration of [the] world", but critics argue that Scientology uses the program to gain positive media attention and recruit new members (known within Scientology as "raw meat").

There has been controversy over the group's goals and activities, although one local official in India welcomed their assistance.

Objectives
According to Hubbard, the objective of the program is to "put basic Dianetics and Scientology technology into view and into use at the raw public level."  In Hubbard's words, The Volunteer Minister's Handbook "will be broadly distributed on Scn and non-Scientology lines, bought by the man on the street. He'll use some of the data, produce some miracles, save a marriage or two, rescue some kid from drugs, help his next door neighbor who's upset because her child's failing in school and couldn't care less, plus brighten up her yawning of Spring and teach him to study, and handle Aunt Martha's dizziness with assists."

Each Volunteer Minister pays to attend a two-week course and purchase Scientology materials; in 1994, these materials cost $435.  The book is called The Scientology Handbook and is 968 pages long.

Scientology spokesman Eric Roux writes: “A Scientology volunteer minister is trained to bring spiritual assistance to anyone in any aspect of life, whether it is to increase his communication ability, his study skills, help raising children or save marriages, as well as dozens of other domains of intervention.”

Origins

The program is the successor to earlier Scientology outreach efforts, notably the "Casualty Contact" program for recruiting new Scientologists (called "preclears") from hospitals, the scenes of accidents and other places where people might have experienced trauma. As Hubbard put it, "One takes every daily paper he can get his hands on and cuts from it every story whereby he might have a preclear. [...] He should represent himself to the person or the person's family as a minister whose compassion was compelled by the newspaper story concerning the person. [...]."

Hubbard advised that "using his minister's card, an auditor need only barge into any non-sectarian hospital, get permission to visit the wards from the superintendent, mentioning nothing about processing but only about taking care of people's souls." The primary objective was simply to recruit more members for Scientology: "Some small percentage of the persons visited or their families will turn up in his group. Thus he will build a group and naturally from that group he will get a great many individual preclears." This was, however, not how the program was to be presented to the general public: "A great many miracles will follow in his wake and he is later to become a subject of the press himself. However, in handling the press we should simply say that it is a mission of the Church to assist those who are in need of assistance."

The Volunteer Ministers program is also intended to operate as a recruitment activity. As Hubbard puts it,

As the benefits of the Volunteer Minister program begin to spread throughout the society, a rank and file of people that have been helped will begin to accumulate. These people will begin to feed into missions and Churches of Scientology from wherever the Volunteer Minister has been at work.

Organizational aspects

In recent years, the Church of Scientology has heavily promoted and greatly increased the profile and size of the Volunteer Ministers program. Church publications say that there are over 95,000 Volunteer Ministers - more than the Peace Corps, Americorps and United Nations volunteer programs combined.
The Church has set a target of recruiting as many Volunteer Ministers as there are policemen in each of the principal countries in which Scientology is active. In 2001, the Church announced a number of target quotas for Volunteer Minister recruitment, as follows:

However, an ARIS demographic study by the City University of New York (CUNY) estimated in 2000 that there may only be 55,000 Scientologists in the whole of the United States.

Recent activities

Volunteer Ministers have frequently been sent to the scenes of major disasters, where they distribute Scientology pamphlets and purport to heal or relieve pain using Scientology techniques such as "Locationals," "Nerve assists" and "Touch assists."

Volunteer Ministers have been sent to the site of relief efforts in Southeast Asia in the wake of the December 2004 tsunami and to London Underground stations that were attacked in the 7 July 2005 London bombings. Eight hundred were sent to New Orleans and the Gulf Coast following Hurricane Katrina. In 2012, news broke that Volunteer Ministers were providing purification rundowns in Vietnam to people who had been exposed to Agent Orange; doctors and researchers criticized the Agent Orange treatments as "unscientific and unproven" and said that they "could be harmful".

The Volunteer Ministers have also worked in Mississippi, Alabama and Louisiana after hurricanes Katrina and Rita, in the 2010 Haiti earthquake, in the Pakistan flood in 2010, in the Fukushima earthquake in 2011, and the May 2014 floods in Bosnia.

Controversy

As with many of the Church of Scientology's programs, the Volunteer Ministers have generated controversy and criticism. The organization provides "spiritual relief" parallel with medical treatment, but also does simple tasks such as helping cleanup or fetch food and generally assist the disaster effort as seems indicated. They have been accused of attempting to take advantage of disasters in order to promote Scientology to a grief-stricken populace. The Church of Scientology insists that assists are given parallel to medical treatment, not in place of it; the Handbook for Scientology Assists stresses in its basic guidelines:  "Always seek first aid and medical attention when needed.  An assist is not a substitute for medical attention or treatment by a qualified doctor.  First, call the doctor.  Then assist the person as you can."

The Volunteer Minister program most heavily promoted by Scientology took place in the immediate aftermath of the 9/11 attacks. Critics of Scientology accused the organization of attempting to take advantage of the disaster in order to promote Scientology to the grief-stricken populace in the area. The National Mental Health Association issued a public warning in response to the conduct of Scientologists in the immediate aftermath of September 11, claiming that Scientologists were "Intentionally confusing [the] public" by presenting themselves as mental health service providers. According to NMHA President Michael M. Faenza, "The public needs to understand that the Scientologists are using this tragedy to recruit new members. They are not providing mental health assistance."

In Russia, after the Beslan school hostage crisis tragedy in 2004, the Health Ministry ordered Scientologists out of the area, saying "that various psychological tactics the groups use, including what it called hypnosis, may be harmful not only for adults, but for children that have already suffered severe mental shock."

In the United Kingdom, Volunteer Ministers played a similar role in the aftermath of the 7 July 2005 London bombings, targeting the families of victims and emergency workers. As in the United States in 2001, this resulted in controversy, and it was reported that Volunteer Ministers had been removed from the vicinity of survivors of the bus bombing in Tavistock Square. It later emerged that the Metropolitan Police had agreed to give the Church of Scientology privileged access to the Police Message Broadcasting System, enabling the Church to dispatch Volunteer Minister rapid-response teams in the event of future emergencies in the capital.

Paul Fletcher, director of the London branch of CCHR and Stefania Cisco, a Director of Special Affairs for Scientology, admitted to an undercover BBC reporter that the purpose of the volunteer ministers was to keep the psychiatrists away, and called this "spiritual security".

After the Virginia Tech massacre, April 16, 2007, 20 Volunteer Ministers were on the campus. Bulletins to Scientology members said that help had been requested by the university provost, the Salvation Army and the Red Cross, but these organizations denied that any requests had been made. The activities of the Volunteer Ministers at Virginia Tech was reported to have received strong criticism from local pastors.

References

External links
Official website
Volunteer Minister official European website
 Scientology Today: VM latest News
 Volunteer Ministers Handbook
Scientology example of a "locational" to make a drunk person sober in few minutes.
Danish writer and photographer Thorsten Overgaard followed the Scientology Volunteer Ministers in Asia after the tsunami
Transcript of BBC Radio Five Live report on Volunteer Ministers, 2 July 2006
Volunteer Ministers were part of Hubbard's plans for a grassroots movement
Church of Scientology Volunteer Ministers Humanitarian Programs

Scientology organizations
Missionaries